Markandeyan is a 2011 Indian Tamil-language film written and directed by FEFSI Vijayan. It stars his son Shabarish, Savika Chaiyadej (Pinky), Nivedhitha, Santhanam in lead. The film score is composed by Sundar C Babu, while cinematography is by D. Sasikumar and Santtonio and editing handled by Raja Mohammed. Markandeyan was panned by critics.

Cast

Shabarish as Markandeyan "Mark"
Savika Chaiyadej (Pinky) as Divya
Nivedhitha as Ilavanchi
Santhanam as Yaanaimudi
Srihari as Varada
Bala Singh as Esakki
Pragathi
M. S. Bhaskar
Nizhalgal Ravi
Tarun Shatriya
Vasu Vikram
Appu K. Sami as Lawyer  
Periya Karuppu Thevar
 Karate Raja
 Muthukaalai
Sree Raam as Young Mark

Production 
FEFSI Vijayan launched his son Shabarish with this film. Thai actress Savika Chaiyadej (Pinky) made her debut into Indian cinema with this film. Shabarish trained for a year in Thai boxing.

Soundtrack 
Songs by Sundar C. Babu. Salman Khan (who worked with FEFSI Vijayan in Wanted and Dabangg), Vijay, and Shriya Saran attended the audio launch.

Reception 
A critic from The New Indian Express opined that "The director has painstakingly worked on the script in the earlier half and given it a fresh feel. However, he could have taken more effort in the second half and made it just as engaging". A critic from Sify gave the film a verdict of "disappointing" and criticised the film. A critic from Behindwoods gave the film a half out of five stars and wrote that "Technically, there is not much that deserves mention except for the effort of the crew to make the action sequences."

References

External links

 Markandeyan Official Website

2011 films
2010s Tamil-language films
Films scored by Sundar C. Babu